Pelagia Goulimari (born 1964) is a Greek-British author, editor, and academic. She specialises in literary criticism, feminist theory, continental philosophy, and writing in English from 1740 to the present. Goulimari is a Research Fellow at Somerville College, Oxford, a Senior Fellow in Feminist Studies within the Humanities Division, and a member of the Faculty of English at the University of Oxford. She co-directs the interdisciplinary MSt programme in Women's, Gender and Sexuality Studies, as well as the Intersectional Humanities network at TORCH (The Oxford Research Centre in the Humanities).

In 1993, Goulimari co-founded Angelaki: Journal of the Theoretical Humanities, an international journal in literary criticism and theory, philosophy, and cultural studies published by Routledge. She remains the journal's editor-in-chief. 

Goulimari has published widely on literary criticism and theory, particularly postmodernism, and on the work of Toni Morrison, Gilles Deleuze, Virginia Woolf, and Pamela Sue Anderson, among others.

Publications

Books and edited collections
After Modernism: Women, Gender, Race (Routledge, 2023)
The Oxford Encyclopedia of Literary Theory (Oxford University Press, 2022) 
Love and Vulnerability: Thinking with Pamela Sue Anderson (Routledge, 2020)
Women Writing Across Cultures: Present, Past, Future (Routledge, 2017)  
Literary Criticism and Theory: From Plato to Postcolonialism (Routledge, 2014)
Toni Morrison (Routledge, 2011)
Postmodernism. What Moment? (Manchester University Press, 2007)

Articles and book chapters 
 ‘Shredding, Burning, Tunnelling: Modernity, Mrs. Dalloway, Sula and my Grandparents circa 1922’, Angelaki 27.3-4 (2022): 163–81.
 'Feminist Theory', The Oxford Encyclopedia of Literary Theory (Oxford University Press, 2022).
 'Genders', The Oxford Encyclopedia of Literary Theory (Oxford University Press, 2022).
 'Theorizing Closeness: A Trans Feminist Conversation' (with Talia Bettcher), Angelaki 22.1 (2017): 49–60.
 ‘“Where are you (really) from?” Transgender Ethics, Ethics of Unknowing, and Transformative Adoption in Jackie Kay’s Trumpet and Toni Morrison’s Jazz’ in Reading Contemporary Black British and African American Women Writers: Race, Ethics, Narrative Form, eds. Jean Wyatt and Sheldon George (Routledge 2020, 196–214).
 ‘“something else to be”: Singularities and Scapegoating Logics in Toni Morrison’s Early Novels’, Angelaki 11.2 (2006): 191–204.
 ‘“Myriad little connections”: Minoritarian Movements in the Postmodernism Debate’, Postmodern Culture 14.3 (Spring 2004).
 ‘A Minoritarian Feminism? Things to Do with Deleuze and Guattari’, Hypatia: A Journal of Feminist Philosophy 14.2 (Spring 1999): 97–120. Later published in Critical Assessments: Deleuze and Guattari, ed. Gary Genosko, Vol. 3 (Routledge 2000: 1480–503).
 ‘The Victim, the Executioner, and the Saviour: A Modern Triangle’, Textual Practice 13.3 (Winter 1999): 447–63.
 ‘On the Line of Flight: How to Be a Realist?’, Angelaki 1.1 (1993): 11–27.

References

Living people
1964 births
Academic journal editors